Paul Barber  is an English football administrator and executive who is currently the chief executive and deputy chairman of Brighton & Hove Albion.

Management career

The Football Association
As Commercial Director, and latterly Director of Marketing and Communications, for The Football Association (The FA), Paul Barber created "FA Partners", The FA's sponsorship programme for 2002–2006 which secured multi million-pound agreements with a range of blue chip sponsors including McDonald’s, Pepsi, Carlsberg, Nationwide Building Society, British Airways, and Umbro. The FA Partners concept linked the sponsors to both the top levels of The FA’s rights - the England team and The FA Cup - and also to the women’s game through the national team and Women’s FA Cup and to grassroots football through The FA Trophy and FA Vase competitions.

Following The FA's decision to re-build Wembley Stadium, Barber was tasked with finding alternative venues for England's matches, for The FA Cup Final and for The FA Community Shield. Barber's answer was the commercially successful and highly popular 'England on the Road' programme which saw England's senior team and under 21 internationals play at different English stadiums, including Old Trafford, Anfield, White Hart Lane, Stadium of Light, St James's Park, St Mary's Stadium, Pride Park, and Villa Park during the new Wembley Stadium's construction. The FA Cup Final and The FA Community Shield was moved to Cardiff's Millennium Stadium. During the same period Barber led the development of “englandfans”, The FA's official supporters' scheme.

Barber's international football experience extends to him being a senior member of England's official travelling party to major tournaments including UEFA's European Championships in 2000 (in the Netherlands and Belgium) under Kevin Keegan's management, and to the 2002 FIFA World Cup in Japan and Korea when England were led by Sven Goran Eriksson. From 1997 Barber acted as a part-time adviser for The FA's ultimately unsuccessful attempt to stage the World Cup in England in 2006 and, latterly, he provided part-time support from his base in Vancouver for The FA's similarly unsuccessful and controversial 2018 bid campaign.

Tottenham Hotspur FC
Barber joined Tottenham Hotspur’s board in 2005. As executive director reporting to chairman Daniel Levy, Barber was responsible for Tottenham’s commercial programme, ticketing and hospitality areas, marketing and brand management, and various aspects of the club’s match day operations. A lifelong Spurs fan, Barber also acted as the club’s main interface with fans’ groups. In 2006, Barber concluded Tottenham’s then record shirt sponsorship agreement, worth a reported £34m over 4 years, with Asian betting firm Mansion.com. Earlier in the same year, he agreed a lucrative multi-year deal with German sportswear firm PUMA which supplied Tottenham’s kit and technical equipment until 2011. Barber left Tottenham in 2010 to become the first British sports executive to lead a Major League Soccer club when he joined Vancouver Whitecaps. He remained on the board at Tottenham Hotspur as a non-executive director until the mid-2011.

Vancouver Whitecaps FC
During his tenure at Vancouver Whitecaps FC, one of the oldest and largest professional soccer clubs in North America, Barber inked a number of major sponsorships with telecommunications giant Bell Canada, EA Sports, Budweiser, Kia Motors, BMO Bank of Montreal, Rogers Sportsnet TV, and TEAM 1040 Radio. In all, it was reported in the Canadian media that the club signed a total of 25 new commercial agreements in a 24-month period. The Vancouver Whitecaps also became the first MLS club to have all its League and Cup matches broadcast live on TV, radio, mobile and online, while also securing more than 15,000 season ticket holders for its first MLS season. 

While in Vancouver, Barber oversaw two complex stadium moves in less than 12 months between November 2010 and October 2011. The Whitecaps completed its 2010 season in the 5,000-seat Swangard Stadium in Burnaby, British Columbia, before moving to the temporary but historic Empire Field site in Vancouver (capacity 27,000) in March 2011, and then on to the newly refurbished 2010 Winter Olympic Games venue, BC Place with a 55,000 capacity, a spectacular retractable roof, and the largest centrally hung video board in North America, in October 2011.

However, the club was unable to replicate its commercial success on the field of play and struggled throughout its first MLS season, leading to the early dismissal of coach Teitur Thordarson and the subsequent appointments of Tom Soehn as interim head coach, and Martin Rennie (who subsequently parted company with the Whitecaps at the end of the 2013 season after two seasons in charge).

Brighton & Hove Albion FC
Following Vancouver Whitecaps' announcement of his decision to return to the UK in the early 2012, Barber was linked to various new roles in English football at Premier League clubs, including a return to Tottenham Hotspur, before surprising some industry observers by accepting the opportunity to join Brighton & Hove Albion in the Football League Championship. His move to become their chief executive was announced on 28 May 2012 and was effective 18 June 2012.

Barber's role at Brighton saw him gain first hand experience of The Football League's Championship level for the first time in his career, as well as working at the American Express Community Stadium, opened in mid-2011, and overseeing the stadium's expansion to a capacity of just over 30,000 in his first full year with the club.

In Barber's first season (2012/13), Brighton recorded their highest league finish for more than 30 years and reached the Championship play-offs with some attendances topping 30,000 for the first time since the 1980s. However, a highly successful season was soured by the acrimonious departure of Uruguayan Manager, Gus Poyet dismissed by the club for gross misconduct.

During the same season, Barber announced Brighton & Hove Albion's most valuable ever sponsorship deal when he confirmed at a press conference on 13 March 2013 that American Express had signed a multi-year agreement to be the Club's shirt sponsor for its men's, women's and youth teams. The deal extended American Express's relationship with Albion which started with the US financial services giant's stadium naming rights agreement in 2010. The club has since further extended and increased the value of its agreement with American Express, a deal now thought to be one of the most lucrative in English football outside of the country’s six biggest clubs.

On 19 July 2013, Brighton confirmed the appointment of former Barcelona star, Oscar Garcia Junyent, as head coach for the 2013/14 season. For the second successive year Brighton & Hove Albion secured a Sky Bet Championship play off spot with a 2–1 victory at Nottingham Forest courtesy of a thrilling last-minute goal in the final game of the season from Argentinian striker, Leonardo Ulloa.

Towards the end of 2013, Paul Barber was named overall CEO of the Year at the annual Football Business Awards (on 7 November 2013). Barber also received the award for Football League Championship CEO of the Year at the same event at Chelsea FC's Stamford Bridge stadium in London. In 2016 Barber was named European Sports Executive of the Year at the Stadium Business Awards. 

Oscar Garcia resigned for personal reasons at the end of the 2013/14 season and working closely with Tony Bloom, Brighton's chairman, Barber started another hunt for a manager to lead Brighton to the Premier League. The initial excitement surrounding the June 2014 appointment of former Liverpool captain and Bayer Leverkusen coach, Sami Hyypia, turned sour when Hyypia failed to get the results needed to sustain Brighton's challenge at the top of the Championship. Hyypia resigned after just 6 months and was replaced by the more experienced Chris Hughton on 31 December 2014. Hughton, like Poyet before him, had worked with Barber at Tottenham Hotspur, went on to steer Brighton clear of a surprise relegation fight to retain the club's Championship for a fifth successive season.

In mid-2014, Brighton confirmed its growing status as one of the country’s most admired clubs by opening one of the UK’s best new training and academy facilities completed at a cost of over £30 million. Named the American Express Elite Football Performance Centre - the club's third long term and lucrative sponsorship agreement with global financial services giant - the facility houses the club's 1st team, academy and women's football operations.. In 2022, the club extended its facilities at the Lancing site to include one of the UK’s first ever purpose built women’s and girls’ training centres, while also further upgrading its facilities for its men’s and boys’ teams with a further overall investment in excess of £25 million.

On the back of its surprisingly poor 2014/15 season, Brighton surprised pundits and Championship rivals alike by setting a new club record with an unbeaten run which, to the end of November 2015, extended to 18 league matches and saw the Seagulls top the Sky Bet Championship. In the same month, Brighton enjoyed more success at the 2015 Football Business Awards where the south coast club were named "Overall Best Football Club to Work For" and "Best Community Scheme (non Premier League)". The club also received wide acclaimfor its highly successful staging of two Rugby World Cup 2015 fixtures including the historic Japanese victory over South Africa.

Brighton went on to miss out on automatic promotion to the Premier League on goal difference at the end of the 2015–16 season when they drew 1–1 at Middlesbrough on the final day, and then failed to get past Sheffield Wednesday in the two-legged Championship play-offs. However, after four EFL Championship play-offs failures in five seasons, the club finally secured automatic promotion to the Premier League in the 2016–17 season – its sixth season at American Express Community Stadium Stadium – but missed out on collecting the Championship title (to Newcastle United) when they drew 1–1 at Aston Villa on the final day of the season. Brighton & Hove Albion's first Premier League season in 2017–18 saw them finish 15th reaching the magical 40 point total with a 1–0 home win over Manchester United and games to spare with the Friday night game broadcast live on Sky Sports.

On 19 November 2018, and in addition to his responsibilities as the club's chief executive, Barber was promoted to deputy chairman.

Further to Graham Potter’s appointment as head coach in succession to Chris Hughton in 2019, who had secured Brighton’s Premier League status for a third successive season before being dismissed, the club went on to cement its position in Premier League in 2019/20 and 2020/21 before securing   its best ever finish in the top flight - 9th - in 2021/22. Former Shaktar Donetsk coach Roberto de Zerbi replaced Potter, who resigned to join Chelsea, soon after the start of the club’s sixth consecutive season in the Premier League in September 2022 with Brighton sitting in 4th place. In De Zerbi’s first match in charge, Brighton stormed in to a 2-0 lead against Liverpool at Anfield with the game eventually finishing 3-3. Shortly ahead of the break for the 2022 World Cup in Qatar, Brighton stunned Potter’s Chelsea by thrashing the west London club 4-1 at the Amex.

Barber was appointed an Officer of the Order of the British Empire (OBE) in the 2023 New Year Honours for services to association football.

Wider business career
Recognised as one of English football's most experienced executives Barber has now spent more than 25 years working in football administration at all levels of the game including time working for The FA at the 2000 European Championships and the 2002 World Cup, Tottenham Hotspur in the Premier League and UEFA Cup, Vancouver Whitecaps FC in Major League Soccer, and Brighton & Hove Albion in England's Football League Championship and in the Premier League.

On 22 June 2015, The Football League in England announced that Barber had been elected to its board of directors as one of three Championship representatives. Barber served two years alongside the League's other directors, who included former Rugby World Cup 2015 CEO, Debbie Jevans, and former National Express and Strategic Rail Authority boss, Richard Bowker, before Brighton secured promotion to the Premier League. During this period, Barber was one of the EFL's FA Council members, a member of the Professional Game Board, and one of The FA's international ambassadors. On 7 June 2018, Barber returned to The FA Council as a Premier League representative. In November 2018, Barber was also re-elected to the Professional Game Board, also as a Premier League representative. Barber remains a Premier League representative in both capacities.

Prior to his career working in professional football, Barber held a variety of senior executive positions in several large British companies including Barclays Bank, Inchcape, Abbey National, Royal & Sun Alliance, as well as the US advertising and communications group Ogilvy & Mather, where he was Chief Executive Officer for Europe, Middle East and Africa (EMEA).

Barber served as a Non-Executive Director for Rose Bowl plc, parent company of Hampshire County Cricket Club, for Tottenham Hotspur FC, following his departure for Vancouver Whitecaps FC, and for Nolan Partners Ltd, a UK-based Sports Executive Search & Recruitment firm, established by The FA's former Human Resources Director, Paul Nolan.

Barber is a regular speaker at major sports industry and business conferences all over the world, including events in the United States, Canada, Australia, China, Middle East and across Europe. Barber has also delivered lectures and key-note presentations at numerous universities and business schools, including Cambridge University's Judge Business School, and Wharton Business School in the United States, various other universities and colleges in the UK, Europe and the US, as well being a guest lecturer on FIFA’s prestigious Diploma in Club Management.

References

Brighton & Hove Albion F.C. non-playing staff
Living people
Tottenham Hotspur F.C. directors and chairmen
Vancouver Whitecaps FC
Year of birth missing (living people)
Officers of the Order of the British Empire